Heteromicta nigricostella is a species of snout moth in the genus Heteromicta. It was described by Ragonot in 1901, and is known from Queensland, Australia.

References

Moths described in 1924
Tirathabini